Mount Albert by-election may refer to several by-elections in the history of the Mount Albert electorate.
Mount Albert by-election, 1947
Mount Albert by-election, 2009
Mount Albert by-election, 2017